Basie/Eckstine Incorporated is a 1959 studio album featuring Billy Eckstine and the Count Basie Orchestra. It was released by Roulette Records and marked Eckstine and Basie's only recorded collaboration.

Track listing 
 "Stormy Monday Blues" - 3:11
 "Lonesome Lover Blues" (Billy Eckstine, Gerald Valentine) - 3:08
 "Blues, the Mother of Sin" (Eckstine, Sid Kuller) - 3:41
 "Jelly, Jelly" (Eckstine, Earl Hines) - 3:02
 "Don't Cry Baby" (James P. Johnson, Saul Bernie, Stella Unger) - 3:31
 "Trav'lin' All Alone" (J. C. Johnson) - 2:54
 "Little Mama" (Eckstine, Kuller) - 3:29
 "I Want a Little Girl"  (Billy Moll, Murray Mencher) - 3:25
 "Drifting" (Charles Brown, Johnny Moore, Eddie Williams) - 3:59
 "Song of the Wanderer" (Neil Moret) - 3:22
 "Piano Man" (Eckstine, Kuller) - 4:04

Personnel 
 Billy Eckstine - vocals

The Count Basie Orchestra
 Count Basie - piano
 Marshal Royal - lead alto saxophone
 Frank Wess - alto saxophone, flute
 Frank Foster, Billy Mitchell - tenor saxophone
 Charlie Fowlkes - baritone saxophone
 Thad Jones, Wendell Culley, Joe Newman, Snooky Young - trumpet
 Henry Coker, Al Grey, Benny Powell - trombone
 Freddie Green - guitar
 Eddie Jones - double bass
 Sonny Payne - drums
 Bobby Tucker - additional piano
 Quincy Jones, Thad Jones & Bobby Tucker - arrangers

Production 
 Teddy Reig - producer
 Michael Cuscuna - CD reissue producer

Notes 

1959 albums
Albums arranged by Quincy Jones
Albums arranged by Thad Jones
Billy Eckstine albums
Count Basie Orchestra albums
Roulette Records albums
Albums produced by Teddy Reig